Looney Tunes is a platform video game developed and published by Sunsoft released for Game Boy in 1992. The game was re-released for Game Boy Color seven years later.

It features Daffy Duck, Tweety, Porky Pig, Taz, Speedy Gonzales, the Road Runner and Bugs Bunny as playable characters. Other Looney Tunes characters include Elmer Fudd, Marvin the Martian, Wile E. Coyote and Sylvester.

Gameplay
There are 7 levels in total each starring a different Looney Tunes character that the player can control. They each have their own special ability. At the end of every level except 2 and 4, a boss must be beaten in order to progress to the next one. A minigame is played after clearing a level.

Reception
IGN gave it a rating of 6/10. French gaming website Jeuxvideo.com gave it 16/20.

References

External links
 Looney Tunes at GameFAQs
 Looney Tunes at Mobygames

1992 video games
Sunsoft games
Platform games
Game Boy games
Game Boy Color games
Single-player video games
Video games featuring Bugs Bunny
Video games featuring Daffy Duck
Video games featuring Sylvester the Cat
Video games featuring the Tasmanian Devil (Looney Tunes)
Video games scored by Manami Matsumae
Video games developed in Japan
Warner Bros. video games